Through the Cracks of Death is an album by Abscess released in 2002.

Track listing
  "Raping the Multiverse"  (3:50)
  "Mourners Will Burn"  (3:24)
  "Through the Cracks of Death"  (5:26)
  "Escalation of Violence"  (4:29)
  "Serpent of Dementia"  (5:41)
  "An Asylum Below"  (5:00)
  "Tomb of the Unknown Junkie"  (4:28)
  "Monolithic Damnation"  (3:37)
  "Die for Today"  (5:06)
  "16 Horrors"  (1:16)
  "Vulnavia"  (1:24)

References

Abscess (band) albums
2002 albums
Relapse Records albums